Eumelus  ( Eúmēlos means "rich in sheep") was the name of:

Mythology 

Eumelus (Gadeirus), the younger twin brother of Atlas in Plato's myth of Atlantis, and the son of Poseidon and Cleito, daughter of the autochthon Evenor and Leucippe. His other brothers were: Ampheres and Evaemon, Mneseus and Autochthon, Elasippus and Mestor, and lastly, Azaes and Diaprepes. Eumelus, along with his nine siblings, became the heads of ten royal houses, each ruling a tenth portion of the island, according to a partition made by Poseidon himself, but all subject to the supreme dynasty of Atlas who was the eldest of the ten.
Eumelus, son of Merops and father of Byssa, Meropis and Agron. The family offended Hermes and were transformed into birds.
Eumelus, companion of Triptolemus. He had a son Antheias who tried to ride the chariot of Triptolemus but fell off and died. Eumelus was the first to settle in the land of Patrae in Achaea and founded Antheia in memory of his son.
Eumelus, son of Eugnotus and father of Botres. He killed his son for having eaten the brains of a sheep that had been sacrificed before it had been put on the altar.
Eumelus, succeeded his father Admetus as the King of Pherae, and his mother was Alcestis, daughter of King Pelias of Iolcus. Eumelus married Iphthime, daughter of Icarius of Sparta, and possibly by her, became the father of Zeuxippus. Eumelus was one of the "suitors of Helen" and thus, led Pherae and Iolcus in the Trojan War on the side of the Greeks. Although one of the best Achaean charioteers, he was the fifth and last in the chariot races because of Athena's sabotage at Patroclus's funeral. Eumelus was also one of the Greeks in the Trojan Horse.
 Eumelus, also known as Eumeles or Eumedes,  a herald and father of Dolon and five girls.
Eumelus, a companion of Aeneas. This is the man who brought the news that the fleet of the hero in Sicily was on fire
Eumelus, one of the Suitors of Penelope who came from Same along with other 22 wooers. He, with the other suitors, was shot dead by Odysseus with the aid of Eumaeus, Philoetius, and Telemachus.

History 
 Eumelus of Corinth, an epic poet of the second half of the 8th century BC

Notes

References 

 Antoninus Liberalis, The Metamorphoses of Antoninus Liberalis translated by Francis Celoria (Routledge 1992). Online version at the Topos Text Project.
 Apollodorus, The Library with an English Translation by Sir James George Frazer, F.B.A., F.R.S. in 2 Volumes, Cambridge, MA, Harvard University Press; London, William Heinemann Ltd. 1921. ISBN 0-674-99135-4. Online version at the Perseus Digital Library. Greek text available from the same website.
 Homer, The Iliad with an English Translation by A.T. Murray, Ph.D. in two volumes. Cambridge, MA., Harvard University Press; London, William Heinemann, Ltd. 1924. . Online version at the Perseus Digital Library.
 Homer, Homeri Opera in five volumes. Oxford, Oxford University Press. 1920. . Greek text available at the Perseus Digital Library.
 Pausanias, Description of Greece with an English Translation by W.H.S. Jones, Litt.D., and H.A. Ormerod, M.A., in 4 Volumes. Cambridge, MA, Harvard University Press; London, William Heinemann Ltd. 1918. . Online version at the Perseus Digital Library
 Pausanias, Graeciae Descriptio. 3 vols. Leipzig, Teubner. 1903.  Greek text available at the Perseus Digital Library.
 Plato, Critias in Plato in Twelve Volumes, Vol. 9 translated by W.R.M. Lamb. Cambridge, Massachusetts, Harvard University Press; London, William Heinemann Ltd. 1925. Online version at the Perseus Digital Library. Greek text available at the same website.
 Publius Ovidius Naso, Metamorphoses translated by Brookes More (1859-1942). Boston, Cornhill Publishing Co. 1922. Online version at the Perseus Digital Library.
 Publius Ovidius Naso, Metamorphoses. Hugo Magnus. Gotha (Germany). Friedr. Andr. Perthes. 1892. Latin text available at the Perseus Digital Library.
 
 

Children of Poseidon
Achaean Leaders
Mythological kings of Pherae
Metamorphoses into birds in Greek mythology
Atlanteans
Characters in the Aeneid
Suitors of Penelope
Atlantis
Deeds of Artemis
Deeds of Athena
Deeds of Hermes
Aegean Sea in mythology